Sardis is a town in Panola County, Mississippi. As of the 2010 census, the town population was 1,703. Sardis is one of two county seats for Panola County; the other is Batesville, on the south side of the Tallahatchie River.

Geography

Demographics

2020 census

As of the 2020 United States Census, there were 1,748 people, 776 households, and 493 families residing in the town.

2000 census
As of the census of 2000, there were 2,038 people, 790 households, and 493 families residing in the town. The population density was 1,028.0 people per square mile (397.4/km). There were 862 housing units at an average density of 434.8 per square mile (168.1/km). The racial makeup of the town was 41.90% White, 56.43% African American, 0.05% Native American, 0.39% Asian, 0.54% from other races, and 0.69% from two or more races. Hispanic or Latino of any race were 1.47% of the population.

There were 790 households, out of which 25.1% had children under the age of 18 living with them, 36.1% were married couples living together, 23.2% had a female householder with no husband present, and 37.5% were non-families. 33.4% of all households were made up of individuals, and 18.6% had someone living alone who was 65 years of age or older. The average household size was 2.50 and the average family size was 3.24.

In the town, the population was spread out, with 26.1% under the age of 18, 9.2% from 18 to 24, 21.2% from 25 to 44, 22.3% from 45 to 64, and 21.2% who were 65 years of age or older. The median age was 39 years. For every 100 females, there were 77.5 males. For every 100 females age 18 and over, there were 72.1 males.

The median income for a household in the town was $23,042, and the median income for a family was $32,933. Males had a median income of $24,783 versus $18,750 for females. The per capita income for the town was $15,195. About 18.4% of families and 24.2% of the population were below the poverty line, including 32.2% of those under age 18 and 24.1% of those age 65 or over.

Education
The Town of Sardis is served by the North Panola School District. North Panola Junior High School in Como and North Panola High School in Sardis serve the community. The Quitman County School District serves the portion of Crenshaw that lies in Quitman County.

Notable people
Charles P. Hall - Lieutenant general of the United States Army, who served in both World Wars. He commanded the XI Corps during the Battle of Bataan.
Germany Kent -  media personality. First person inducted into North Panola School District Hall of Fame.
John C. Kyle -  Democratic politician from the US state of Mississippi during the late 19th century.
KJ Jefferson - Starting quarterback for the Arkansas Razorbacks football team
Nolan Mettetal - Mississippi state legislator

References

External links

Panola Partnership website
Paying Price to Win: KJ Jefferson Comes Back With Bruised Knee to Lead Win

 
Towns in Mississippi
Towns in Panola County, Mississippi
County seats in Mississippi